Crossway Baptist Church is a Baptist Evangelical multi-site megachurch, headquartered in Burwood East, one of Melbourne’s eastern suburbs. It is affiliated with the Australian Baptist Ministries.

History
The church was founded by the Reverend J.H Newnham in 1954 as Blackburn Baptist Church. 

It originally met in a small hall as a Sunday school class on the corner of Holland and Canterbury Roads in Blackburn South. The church then relocated to 19 Holland Road, Blackburn South (now the site of New Life Evangelical Church), and later moved in September 1995 to the current location, 2 Vision Drive, Burwood East after which it changed its name to Crossway Baptist Church the following year. In February 2008, Dale Stephenson became Senior Pastor of the church.

The overall attendance for 2016 was 6,675.

Locations 
Crossway has planted daughter churches in Craigieburn, Cranbourne, Moreland and Stonnington as well as a number of other smaller experimental church plants. 

They have also planted a second campus in 2016 in Berwick, in southeastern Melbourne. In 2021, Brighton Baptist Church became the third campus of Crossway.

As of 2022, Crossway has three campuses: Burwood East, South East, and Brighton.

References

External links 
 

Baptist churches in Melbourne
Evangelical megachurches in Australia
Churches completed in 1954
1954 establishments in Australia
Baptist multisite churches
Buildings and structures in the City of Whitehorse